Darryl Cunningham (born 1960) is a British author and cartoonist who has written the books Science Tales (also known, in the US, as How to Fake a Moon Landing), Psychiatric Tales, The Age of Selfishness and Billionaires: The Lives of the Rich and Powerful.

Biography
Cunningham graduated from Leeds College of Art in Leeds, West Yorkshire. He has stated that his influences include Gustav Klimt, Egon Schiele, and George Grosz. The book Psychiatric Tales was partly inspired by Cunningham's years spent working as a health care assistant on an acute psychiatric ward in his native England, as well as his own experience with acute depression.

Books
Cunningham's books include Psychiatric Tales (2010, Blank Slate Books) and Science Tales (2013, Myriad Editions). The foreword for the American edition of Science Tales, entitled How to Fake a Moon Landing: Exploring the Myths of Science Denial, was written by Andrew Revkin.

Psychiatric Tales received a positive review in The Observer from Rachel Cooke, who wrote that it was "an unsettling but rewarding experience." Cian O'Luanaigh also reviewed the book favourably, writing that it provides "an enlightening look at mental illness."

Science Tales also received critical acclaim, for instance from New Scientist, who wrote that Cunningham's "charming artwork complements his concise arguments". The book was also called "fantastic" by Cory Doctorow, who wrote that Cunningham "has a real gift for making complex subjects simple."

Billionaires describes the lives and influence of Jeff Bezos, Rupert Murdoch, and the Koch brothers.

Cartoons and comics
In addition to his books, Cunningham is well known for his cartoons, which have appeared on the website of Forbidden Planet, and have also been featured in the Act-i-vate collective. Additionally, his biography of Ayn Rand has been featured on io9, and his strip about global warming, posted on his blog in December 2010, has been featured on Phil Plait's blog Bad Astronomy, with Plait saying that Cunningham is "careful to present the facts, and to be balanced where called for." He has also created several webcomic strips, including Super-Sam and John-of-the-Night and The Streets of San Diablo.

References

External links
darryl-cunningham.blogspot.co.uk — Cunningham's blog

British cartoonists
1960 births
Living people
British writers
People from Keighley
British sceptics